The 1931 Georgetown Hoyas football team represented Georgetown University during the 1931 college football season. Led by Tommy Mills in his second season as head coach, the team went 4–5–1.

Schedule

References

Georgetown
Georgetown Hoyas football seasons
Georgetown Hoyas football